Louis Thuayre (17 January 1895 – 28 September 1948) was a French racing cyclist. He rode in the 1920 Tour de France.

References

1895 births
1948 deaths
French male cyclists
Place of birth missing